Elsie Arntzen (born May 7, 1956) is an American educator and politician from the U.S. state of Montana who serves as the Superintendent of Public Instruction of the State of Montana. Prior to this, she was a member of the Montana Legislature.

Early life and career 
In 1992, Arntzen became a 5th grade school teacher for the Billings School District.

Montana State Legislature
In 2004, Arntzen was elected to Montana House of Representatives for District 53, which includes a portion of Yellowstone County.

In 2012 Arntzen was elected to the Montana Senate for a four-year term.

Superintendent of Public Instruction 
In 2016, Artzen was elected as the Montana Superintendent of Public Instruction, which leads the state's prime education agency, the Montana Office of Public Instruction.

In Artzen's first year in office, Montana received $24 million over the course of three years through the U.S. Department of Education's Striving Readers Comprehensive Literacy Program, in effort to advance literacy skills in the state. As the newly elected superintendent, Arntzen was responsible in implementing the Every Student Succeeds Act (ESSA) in Montana. Her office released their state ESSA plan in September 2017 and subsequently had the plan approved by the U.S. Department of Education in January 2018. In the same year, Arntzen offered new online mental health and suicide prevention resources available for teachers. The program is provided through Montana's Learning Hub through the Project AWARE-MT SOARS grant funding. The contract, with Kognito Interactive Programs, provided unlimited access for all Montana educators, school staff, and OPI partners over a 12-month period. In June 2018, Arntzen announced that Montana was one of ten states to receive a $3.4 million grant from the U.S. Department of Defense for the Troops to Teachers program. Arntzen's Montana Ready initiative has promoted career and technical education, work-based learning, individualized learning, and expanded public-private partnerships.

During the 2019 Montana legislative session, she advocated for legislation to keep predators out of Montana classrooms. In an editorial published on January 31, 2019, Arntzen criticized the Montana Public Education Center (MT-PEC) for opposing the Student Safety Accountability Act, which banned sexual activity between an employee of a school district and a student. MT-PEC is noted as being a statewide organization that is composed of the Montana School Boards Association, the School Administrators of Montana, the Montana Quality Education Coalition, the Montana Federation of Public Employees, and the Montana Association of School Business Officials.

She is a member of the Council of Chief State School Officers School Safety Steering Committee.

Personal life 
Arntzen's husband is Steven. They have two children. Arntzen and her family live in Billings, Montana. Her husband, Steven is the President and CEO of Century Gaming Technologies. Century Gaming Technologies is the largest route operator of gambling gaming machines in Montana.

In 1992, Arntzen became a 5th grade school teacher for the Billings School District.

Electoral history

2004

2006

2008

2010

2012

2016

2020

References

External links 
 Elsie Arntzen at ballotpedia.org

1956 births
21st-century American politicians
21st-century American women politicians
Educators from Montana
American women educators
Living people
Republican Party members of the Montana House of Representatives
Republican Party Montana state senators
Montana State University alumni
Politicians from Billings, Montana
Superintendents of Public Instruction of Montana
Women state legislators in Montana
Candidates in the 2014 United States elections